Crystal Caliburn is a 1993 video game by Japanese studio LittleWing (ja) and published by StarPlay for Macintosh and Windows; it was later released for Windows Mobile and iOS.

Gameplay
Crystal Caliburn is a pinball game with multiball action.

Reception
In 1996, Computer Gaming World declared Crystal Caliburn the 140th-best computer game ever released.

Reviews
LeveL 3 (04/1995)
All Game Guide (1998)
Mac Game Gate (Nov 02, 1997)
ASM (Aktueller Software Markt) (Jan, 1995)
PC Shareware (Apr, 1997)

References

1993 video games
Classic Mac OS games
IOS games
Pinball video games
Video games developed in Japan
Windows games
Windows Mobile games